The 2018–19 season was Oud-Heverlee Leuven's 17th competitive season in professional football and the team's third consecutive season at the second level following their relegation from the Belgian Pro League in 2016.

Although deemed as potential candidates for promotion at the start of the season, OH Leuven was never in contention and was always closer to the bottom of the table than to the top. After missing out on winning the opening tournament, going out early against amateur team Dessel Sport in the Belgian Cup and several disappointing results in the closing tournament, English coach Nigel Pearson was sacked in January 2019 and replaced by the duo of Vincent Euvrard (manager) and Franky Vercauteren (sports advisor).

After the change, despite scoring more points, the team was not able to avoid the relegation play-offs, however with four wins out of six matches, the club avoided relegation in the end.

2018–19 squad
This section lists players who were in Oud-Heveree Leuven's first team squad at any point during the 2018–19 season
The symbol § indicates player left mid-season
The symbol # indicates player joined mid-season
The symbol ¥ indicates a youngster who has appeared on the match sheet at least once during the season (possibly as unused substitute) 
Italics indicate loan player

Transfers

The first transfer news regarding the 2018–19 squad came in March, when Mechelen announced that despite their relegation from the Belgian First Division A, Ivorian defender Mamadou Bagayoko would remain at the team. He was already on loan from OH Leuven but would transfer permanently at the end of the season. One month later, another player left for Mechelen, as winger Nikola Storm signed a deal with the club to transfer there permanently after his loan from Club Brugge to OH Leuven would come to an end at the end of the 2017–18 season.

The month of May involved the first new reinforcements, as OH Leuven brought in two Belgian youngsters: Olivier Myny was signed from Waasland-Beveren while Jellert van Landschoot was loaned from Club Brugge. Meanwhile, Pepingen-Halle, playing in the Belgian Third Amateur Division, had announced the signing of third goalkeeper Andreas Suederick.

In June, with Samy Kehli and Elliott Moore, two players were kept that were on loan during the previous season. Kehli was signed permanently from Lokeren, while the loan deal of Moore was extended with one more season. On top of this, also two new players joined the club as French experienced defender Frédéric Duplus was signed from Lens, after already playing in Belgium for Zulte Waregem, White Star Brussels and Antwerp, followed by English youth international George Hirst from Sheffield Wednesday.

Early July, both Thomas Azevedo and Geert Berben moved to Lommel, their former team. Azevedo was already on loan to Lommel during the second half of the previous season and became a free agent player after his contract with OH Leuven ended, while Berben had been on loan to Oosterzonen Oosterwijk and was now sold. Later that same month, two youngsters left the squad, as striker Din Sula (who had been out on loan to Lommel) was signed by Waasland-Beveren and Jordy Gillekens was loaned to the youth squad of Fiorentina. The only incoming transfer in July was that of Dutch striker Sam Hendriks, arriving from Go Ahead Eagles. Later that summer, two players signed for Belgian First Amateur Division teams as their contracts had ended: experienced midfielder Flavien Le Postollec signed for Deinze, while youngster Jordy Lokando, who had returned from a loan to Heist, now moved permanently to RWDM47.

As was the case for the last few seasons already, OH Leuven was again active on transfer deadline day, signing no less than three players. While the interest of OH Leuven in French midfielder Redouane Kerrouche from Paris had been apparent already over the prior weeks and the signing therefore anticipated, the loan deals of youngsters Ahmed Touba (from Club Brugge) and especially Polish 14 times international Bartosz Kapustka (from Leicester City) to many came as more of a surprise.

Finally, throughout the summer some players did not have their contracts extended or saw their loan deals come to an end. Youngsters Dico Jap Tjong and Godwin Odibo were released, Benjamin Bambi and Leo Njengo returned from loans to Heist and Dessel Sport respectively, but were placed at the OH Leuven reserves. The loan deal of defender Benjamin Boulenger from Charleroi ended and was not prolonged neither.

During the 2018–19 winter transfer window, with the team suffering in the league while having a large squad, several transfers were expected on both incoming and outgoing side. The first transfer was however only announced mid-January and concerned a loan deal of Leo Njengo, who had been playing for the reserves so far this season and was given playing time with Belgian First Amateur Division-side Heist. Two incoming signings followed just after that, with central defender Sascha Kotysch and striker Thomas Henry. While Kotysch arrived from Sint-Truiden, the transfer of Henry was surprising as he was signed from direct opponents Tubize in the fight against relegation.

The final transfers of the 2018–19 season all happened in the last two days before closing of the transfer window. First another striker was brought into the squad with Yanis Mbombo, coming from Excel Mouscron. No mention was made whether it concerned a loan deal or a permanent move, only that Mbombo had signed a contract until the end of the season. On transfer deadline day, OH Leuven got rid of four strikers, first sending youngsters Jo Gilis and Daan Vekemans out on loan to Eendracht Aalst, followed by Dutchman Sam Hendriks who returned to his home country after just half a season, to play out on loan for Cambuur. In the final hours, 2016–17 club top scorer Esteban Casagolda was sold to league competitors Roeselare. The final day also involved one more incoming transfer with midfielder Aboubakar Keita arriving on loan from Copenhagen.

Transfers In

Transfers Out

Belgian First Division B

OHL's season in the Belgian First Division B began on 4 August 2018.

Results

Belgian Cup

Results

Squad statistics
Includes only competitive matches.

Appearances
Players with no appearances not included in the list.

Goalscorers

Clean sheets

Footnotes

References

External links
 

2018-19
Belgian football clubs 2018–19 season
Oud-Heverlee Leuven seasons